Butel Municipality is one of the ten municipalities that make up the City of Skopje, the capital of North Macedonia. The municipality administration consists of a council and mayor.

A cemetery in Butel is where the grave of George Zorbas, the character upon whom Nikos Kazantzakis based the fictional Alexis Zorbas of his novel Zorba the Greek, is located.

Geography 
Butel is located along the north-central and north-eastern areas of Skopje not far the modern city center and most of the municipality extends eastward in a panhandle shape toward the Skopska Crna Gora mountain range. It borders Gazi Baba Municipality to the southeast, Čair Municipality to the south, Karpoš Municipality to the southwest, Šuto Orizari Municipality and Čučer-Sandevo Municipality to the northwest, and Lipkovo Municipality to the northeast.

History 
Prior to 2004 Butel municipality was within the boundaries of a larger Čair municipality that had a majority Macedonian population (60.60%), followed by Albanians (20.89%), Turks (4.12%), Bosniaks (3.40%), Romani (1.46%) and Serbs (2.11%). The new territorial-administrative reform of 2004 divided the municipal unit into a smaller Čair municipality with an Albanian majority and a separate Butel municipality with a Macedonian majority. The new boundaries of Čair municipality resulted in the loss of its industrial zone to Butel municipality which previously provided most of the revenue for the Čair municipal budget.

Demographics 
According to the national census from 2021 Butel has 37,968 inhabitants. Ethnic groups in the municipality include:

Per the 2021 Census Butel had a total population of 40,612, of whom 20,442 were female and 20,170 male.[5]

Inhabited places 

There are 5 inhabited places in this municipality.

References

External links 

 Official website

 
Butel
Municipalities of Skopje